West Virginia Route 65 is a north–south state highway located within Mingo County, West Virginia, United States. The southern terminus of the route is at West Virginia Route 49 in Matewan. The northern terminus is at U.S. Route 52 in Naugatuck.

Major intersections

References

065
Transportation in Mingo County, West Virginia